Bashir Ahmed or Bashir Ahmad may refer to:

Bashir Ahmed (field hockey) (born 1934), Pakistani field hockey player
Mirza Bashir Ahmad (1893–1963), Religious scholar and writer
Mirza Basheer-ud-Din Mahmood Ahmad (1889–1965), Second Caliph of the Ahmadiyya Muslim Community
Bashir Ahmad (athlete) (born 1967), Pakistani Olympic sprinter
Bashir Ahmed (cricketer) (1924–2013), Indian cricketer
Bashir Ahmad (Afghan cricketer) (born 1995), Afghan cricketer
Bashir Ahmed (Masturi MLA), Indian politician
Bashir Ahmed (Member of Parliament) (1926–1978), Indian lawyer and politician
Bashir Ahmed (miniaturist) (born 1953), Pakistani painter
Bashir Ahmad (Bangladeshi athlete) (born 1941), Bangladeshi athlete
Bashir Ahmad (singer) (1939–2014), Bangladeshi singer
Bashir Ahmad (mixed martial artist) (born 1982), Pakistani-American mixed martial artist
Bashir Ahmad (Scottish politician) (1940–2009), Karachi-born Member of the Scottish Parliament
Bashir Ahmad (camel driver) (c. 1913–1992), 'surprise' visitor to the U.S. White House
Bashir Ahmad (Guantanamo detainee 1005) (born 1975), Pakistan-born Guantanamo detainee

See also
Ahmad Bashir (1923–2004), Pakistani writer, journalist, intellectual and film director